Siveh Kadeh, also known as Sib Goda, may refer to:
 Siveh Kadeh-ye Olya
 Siveh Kadeh-ye Sofla